St. Thomas Higher Secondary School, Kozhencherry is a school in Kerala, the southwestern state of India. It is located in the town centre, on the way from Kozhencherry to the district capital Pathanamthitta.

Kozhencherry

In the early twentieth century, Kozhencherry was a small village in Pathanamthitta Taluk of Quilon District in the princely state of Travancore. The land was fertile and so the people were mainly farmers. Kozhencherry, on the banks of River Pamba was a commercial hub when river boats were the main mode of transport.

Meaning of certain terms
The naming system adopted in Kerala schools are as follows.
 Primary school: In earlier days classes included-  Class 1 to class 4. Later Preparatory classes from Lower secondary was moved to Primary and was named Class 5.
 Upper primary (Primary schools): In earlier days classes included- Preparatory, Form I, II and III. Later after moving Preparatory class to primary section, classes included Standards 6 to 8.
 Secondary (High schools): In earlier days classes included- Form IV, V and VI. 
Later it was changed to Standards 9 and 10, Form VI became part of +2.
 Higher secondary schools: When pre-university class from colleges affiliated to universities were moved to Upper secondary, such schools changed the name to Higher secondary schools. These schools include Standards 9, 10 and +2.
 Headmaster and Principals: Titles of the head of Higher secondary schools are Principals and others, Headmaster/Headmistress.

History
An English Medium School was opened in Kozhencherry by the Kottayam (Anglican) Mission in 1822 with 40 students and two teachers. In 1904 St. Thomas Mar Thoma parish took over the running of the school. By 1910 the Travancore Education Code of 1085 M.E. (1910) came into force and the school was approved as a Middle School (Form I, II and III). In 1918 approval was given to start High School Classes (Forms IV, V and VI). It was at this time the main building, that is still in use, was completed.

Till 1941 it was a co-educational school. In that year St.Mary's Girls High School was opened nearby and all the girls were moved to the new school. Thus from 1941 it became a boys' school.

In 1992, the Kerala government moved pre-university classes from colleges to certain high schools and the school was one of them. The classes known as +2, admitted girls also. From that year onwards it was known as St. Thomas Higher Secondary School.

Courses
The school now offers the following courses (following Kerala Government Syllabus)
 Upper Primary
 High School
 Higher Secondary – a two-year course leading to university education.

Management
This school is managed by St. Thomas Marthoma Church, Kozhencherry. The vicar is the ex officio Manager of the school.

Managers
Rev. C.P. philipose (1904–14) Rev. K.T. Thomas, Kurumthottickal (1914–55), Rev. K.J. Philip (1956–59), Rev. K.C. Thomas (1960–61), Rev. C.G. Alexander (1961–62.

Notable alumni
A few notable ex-students of the school include:
 Most Rt. Rev. Dr. Alexander Mar Thoma Metropolitan
 Most Rt. Rev. Dr. Philipose Mar Chrysostom Marthoma Valia Metropolitan
 Most Rt. Rev. Dr. Joseph Mar Thoma Metropolitan
 Most Rt. Rev. Philipose Mar Eusibeos Metropolitan
 Fr. Dr. V. C. Samuel Theologian 
 Chittedathu Sankupilla, freedom fighter
 N.G. Chacko. freedom fighter
 C.M. Ninan, orator
 Riva Tholoor Philip, Kerala Congress leader
 K. M. George (Karimpumannil Mathai George), eminent Malayalam writer and educator, awarded Padma Shri in 1988 and Padma Bhushan in 2001
 Kadammanitta Ramakrishnan, poet
 Makkapuzha P.S.Vasudevan Pillai, former president of Nair Service Society
 Judge Mathews P Mathew, High Court Judge
 P.V. Neelakanta Pillai, former president of Nair Service Society
 Lipin Raj, Civil Servant and Writer

References

External links
 Kozhenchery St. Thomas and St. Marys Schools Alumni Association
 :ml:ലിപിൻ രാജ് എം.പി

Christian schools in Kerala
Primary schools in Kerala
High schools and secondary schools in Kerala
Schools in Pathanamthitta district